André Lamar Phillips (born September 5, 1959) is a retired American track and field athlete who is best known for winning the 400 metres hurdles gold medal at the 1988 Olympic Games.

Phillips spent most of his career in the shadow of his idol, Edwin Moses, frequently as runner up during Moses' unequaled winning streak. He managed to beat him once, at the 1988 Olympic Games in Seoul. In 1983, Phillips finished fifth in the 400 m hurdles at the inaugural World Athletics Championships. In 1985, in absence of Moses, Phillips won his only US National Championship title, and also won the IAAF World Cup. In 1988, Phillips lost to Moses at the Olympic trials, but showed a good pace at Olympics, winning his heat and semifinal. In the final, Phillips ran his personal best 47.19 to win a gold medal, beating second-place Amadou Dia Ba from Senegal by 0.04 seconds.  At the time he was the second fastest individual over the hurdles. The two times currently still rank them as the #10 and #11 performers of all time. Although Moses ran his fastest Olympic final, he finished only third in a time of 47.56.  It was the final race of Moses' career.

In 2009, Phillips was inducted into the National Track and Field Hall of Fame.

Phillips attended at University of California, Los Angeles, and won the 400 m hurdles at the NCAA championships in 1981. Prior to that, he attended Silver Creek High School in San Jose, California, where he won the CIF California State Meet in the 330-yard low hurdles in 1977. in 36.43.  He continues to hold the 330-yard low hurdle record at Silver Creek at 37.1 sec.  He joins 1976 4x100 meter relay Gold medalist, and individual 200 meters Silver medalist Millard Hampton, in one of the rare instances (the school claims only eight exist) of two unrelated Olympic Gold Medalists coming from the same high school.  Silver Creek continues to host the "Hampton Phillips Classic" named in their honor.

Phillips is a former teacher at Stagg High School, a former Assistant Principal at Franklin High School, and is now the current Principal at Stagg High School in Stockton, California. Phillips earned his educational doctorate (Ed.D.) at Concordia University Irvine.

References

 Wallechinksy, David and Jaime Loucky (2008). "Track & Field (Men): 400-Meter Hurdles". In The Complete Book of the Olympics – 2008 Edition. London: Aurum Press Limited. pp. 165–6.

External links 
 
 

1959 births
Living people
African-American male track and field athletes
American male hurdlers
Schoolteachers from California
Athletes (track and field) at the 1988 Summer Olympics
Junior college men's track and field athletes in the United States
Medalists at the 1988 Summer Olympics
Olympic gold medalists for the United States in track and field
Track and field athletes from Milwaukee
Track and field athletes from San Jose, California
UCLA Bruins men's track and field athletes
21st-century African-American people
20th-century African-American sportspeople